Leptospermum minutifolium, commonly known as the small-leaved tea-tree, is a species of shrub that is endemic to eastern Australia. It has relatively small egg-shaped leaves, white flowers borne singly on the ends of branches and fruit that remains on the plant.

Description
It has variable bark, sometimes thin and rough, otherwise smooth and flaking.

Taxonomy and naming
Leptospermum minutifolium was first formally described in 1946 by Cyril Tenison White in the Proceedings of the Royal Society of Queensland from specimens collected by "Mrs. M.S. Clemens" near Wallangarra.

Distribution and habitat
The small-leaved tea-tree grows in swamps and on rocky creek banks on the Northern Tablelands of New South Wales and the Granite Belt of south-east Queensland.

References

minutifolium
Flora of New South Wales
Flora of Queensland
Myrtales of Australia
Plants described in 1923